Lisa Martinez may refer to:

Lisa Martínez
Lisa Martinez (footballer)